Perion is an Israel-based technology company that provides digital advertising products and services. It is headquartered in Holon, Israel, with offices in Tel Aviv, Paris, New York, London, Chicago, Boston, Kiev, Barcelona, and Seattle.

History
Perion was formerly IncrediMail, an email company founded in 1999 by cousins Yaron and Ofer Adler. Soon after its founding, they raised $3.3 million from private and institutional sources. The company created an IPO on NASDAQ in January 2006 and listed on the Tel Aviv Stock Exchange in 2007.

Perion was managed by its original founders until August 2010, when Josef Mandelbaum was appointed CEO. Mandelbaum had previously been CEO of American Greetings Interactive, the internet branch of American Greetings.

In August 2011, Perion acquired the Redmond-based Smilebox for $32 million. Smilebox is an application for creating slideshows, e-cards, invitations and other digital photo albums.

In November 2011, the company name changed to Perion, the Hebrew word for "productivity".

In November 2012, Perion purchased Israel-based SweetPacks (or SweetIM) for approximately $41 million. SweetPacks produced a variety of downloadable content for everyday use.

In January 2014, Perion acquired Conduit's ClientConnect business in an all-stock transaction valued at $660 million.

In June 2014, the firm acquired San Francisco-based Grow Mobile as part of a repositioning of the company to focus on business-to-business services.

In December 2015, the firm acquired the digital advertising company Undertone for $180 million.

In September 2016, Josef Mandelbaum announced that he would step down as CEO.

In April 2017, Doron Gerstel became the CEO. Upon his arrival at Perion, Gerstel took steps to reduce the company’s debt and improve “operational efficiency”. The company also expanded its digital television advertising business.

In January 2020, Perion acquired Content IQ, a New York-based startup that optimizes digital advertising by doing tracking and analytics without cookies.

In July 2020, Perion bought the assets of a digital publisher-focused ad-tech company called Pub Ocean, which it integrated into Content IQ.

See also
 Conduit (company)
 Conduit toolbar
 Download Valley

References

Companies based in Tel Aviv
Companies listed on the Nasdaq
Companies listed on the Tel Aviv Stock Exchange
Software companies established in 1999
Software companies of Israel
1999 establishments in Israel